Mukhurisi or Samokalako (English: The province of towns), is a historical place in West Georgia and was the central province of Lazica. Mukhurisi was located in a strategical location. The main trade routes in Lazica was passing through Mukhurisi.

Geography 
It is located in a plain area, between the rivers of Rioni and Tskhenistsqali. The most fertile soils of Colchis Kingdom was located in that area.

History 
It is claimed that name of the area was derived from castle called Mukhrisi, which exact location is unknown. First mention about Mukhurisi was in VI. or VII. century.

Sources 

 მუსხელიშვილი დ., ქსე, ტ. 7, გვ. 232, თბ., 1984

Lazica
Former provinces of Georgia (country)